The Cape Sorell Lighthouse is a heritage-listed lighthouse that is located on Cape Sorell in the West Coast region of Tasmania, Australia.

Constructed and first lit in 1899, the  lighthouse is the only structure remaining from a brick complex of tower, three houses and engine room, except for the foundation remnants of the three keepers' residences.

Initially fed by vapourised kerosene, the station was automated in 1971 and in 1998, the light was converted to solar power.

Further automation occurred in 2012.

See also

 History of Tasmania
 List of lighthouses in Tasmania

References

External links
 Australian Maritime Safety Authority

Lighthouses completed in 1899
Lighthouses in Tasmania
Tasmanian places listed on the defunct Register of the National Estate
Commonwealth Heritage List places in Tasmania
1899 establishments in Australia
Cape Sorell
Tasmanian Heritage Register